Lightower Fiber Networks, founded in 2006, was a provider of telecommunications and IT services. It offered cloud computing, colocation hosting, and connectivity.

Description
The company's network spans the Northeast, Mid-Atlantic and Midwest United States including Connecticut, Illinois, Indiana, Kentucky, Maine, Massachusetts, Maryland, Michigan, New Jersey, New York, North Carolina, Ohio, Pennsylvania, Rhode Island, Vermont, Virginia, Washington, DC, and New Hampshire. Additionally, Lightower offers service in both Toronto and London. The network comprises over 33,000 route miles of fiber.

Lightower’s products include network and video transport, alternative access, nationwide long haul services, dark fiber, Ethernet, and cloud computing services.  Lightower has built out access to over 22,000 service locations throughout the Northeast, Mid-Atlantic, and Midwest including 275+ data centers and 5,000+ wireless towers, rooftop cell sites, and small cells.

Customers include Fortune 500 businesses, enterprise, carriers, financial services, media, healthcare, education, and government.

The company was acquired by Berkshire Partners in December 2012 when it also acquired Sidera Networks and announced plans to merge them under the Lightower brand.  Its previous owners were M/C Partners and Pamlico Capital (the investing unit of Wachovia before its takeover by Wells Fargo.  Those two companies had bought it from National Grid in 2007. Lightower was bought by Crown Castle in July 2017, and no longer exists as a separate company. 

The company was the title sponsor of the Lightower Conference Classic, now called the Roc City Hoops Classic.

Mergers and acquisitions

2007

National Grid Wireless- Acquisition (NEESCom)

2008 

Keyspan Communications - Acquisition
Hudson Valley DataNet - Acquisition

2010

Veroxity Technology Partners - Acquisition 
Lexent Metro Connect New York City based neutral telecommunications provider that owns, operates, builds and maintains its own dark fiber network in New York, Northern New Jersey, and surrounding areas. - Acquisition 
Open Access, Inc. - Acquisition

2013
Sidera Networks - Merger

2015
Fibertech - Merger
Colocation Zone - Acquisition

2016
Datacenter101 - Acquisition

References 

"Lightower Picks Ciena for 100G". 11 January 2012.
"Lightower’s Ultra-Low Latency Network Provides Fastest Networking to Key Financial Centers". 3 November 2011.
"Lightower Announces New Network Expansion Projects in New York Metro and Southern Connecticut". 21 June 2011.
”Lightower Completes Acquisition of Open Access Inc.” 1 April 2011.
”Lightower Acquires Veroxity Technology”. 25 May 2010.

External links 
  
 Lightower on Twitter

Companies based in Middlesex County, Massachusetts
Telecommunications companies based in Massachusetts
Synchronous optical networking
Telecommunications companies established in 2001